Gilletiodendron glandulosum is a species of legume in the family Fabaceae. It is found only in Mali. It is threatened by habitat loss.

References

External links
 

Detarioideae
Flora of Mali
Vulnerable plants
Taxonomy articles created by Polbot